Volleyball for men is played at the Asian Games since the 1958 edition in Tokyo, Japan. Women event is played since the 1962 edition in Jakarta, Indonesia.

Summary

Men

Women

Men – Nine-a-side

Women – Nine-a-side

Medal table

Participating nations

Men

Women

Men – Nine-a-side

Women – Nine-a-side

List of medalists

External links
 Official AVC website

 
Sports at the Asian Games
Asian